Jens Gaiser (born August 15, 1978 in Baiersbronn) is a German nordic combined skier who has competed since 1998. He won a silver medal at the 2006 Winter Olympics in Turin in the 4 x 5 km team event. Gaiser also finished 19th in the 7.5 km sprint event at the 2002 Winter Olympics in Salt Lake City.

Gaiser's best finish at the FIS Nordic World Ski Championships was 31st in the 7.5 km sprint event at Ramsau in 1999. His best World Cup career finish was fourth in a 15 km individual event in Norway in 2001.

References

  

1978 births
Nordic combined skiers at the 2002 Winter Olympics
Nordic combined skiers at the 2006 Winter Olympics
German male Nordic combined skiers
Living people
Olympic silver medalists for Germany
Nordic combined Grand Prix winners
Olympic Nordic combined skiers of Germany
Olympic medalists in Nordic combined
Medalists at the 2006 Winter Olympics